John Murdoch Garrett (born June 17, 1951) is a Canadian former professional ice hockey goaltender and television sports commentator. He played in the World Hockey Association from 1973 to 1979 and then in the National Hockey League from 1979 to 1985. After retiring from playing he turned to broadcasting.

Biography
Garrett was born in Trenton, Ontario.

Playing career
Originally selected in the 1971 NHL Entry Draft by the St. Louis Blues, Garrett played one year for the Blues' Central Hockey League affiliate before joining the Portland Buckaroos of the Western Hockey League for half a season and then moving on to the Richmond Robins of the American Hockey League. He signed with the Minnesota Fighting Saints of the World Hockey Association in 1973-74.  He would play with the Fighting Saints until leaving the team Feb. 25, 1976. He then signed with the Toronto Toros, and would follow the Toros franchise when it relocated to Birmingham. In the final WHA season, Garrett was traded to the New England Whalers, and would remain with the franchise when it entered the NHL. He holds the record for the most losses by any goalie in WHA history. Garrett would also play for the Quebec Nordiques and Vancouver Canucks of the NHL before retiring at the start of the 85-86 season.

Garrett was involved in one of the oddest scenarios in the history of the NHL All-Star Game. Replacing an injured Richard Brodeur, the Vancouver Canucks only representative at the 1983 All-Star game that year, John Garrett was voted the game's MVP before the end of the game. After Wayne Gretzky scored four times in the last ten minutes, a re-vote was held and Gretzky was named the All-Star Game MVP.

Broadcasting career
Garrett retired before the 1985–86 season. He had been offered the position of assistant general manager by Canucks' GM Harry Neale, but Neale was fired and the offer subsequently withdrawn. Garrett then began his broadcasting career in 1986-87. He worked as a colour commentator on CBC's Hockey Night in Canada. Within a few years, he was considered a valuable member of the team and was assigned his first conference final in 1991 — his first of eight in a row. During that time, he was also the lead colour commentator on Edmonton Oilers local telecasts, working along with Bruce Buchanan. He left CBC in 1998 to join the fledgling CTV Sportsnet (now Rogers Sportsnet). He worked as a studio analyst on national broadcasts, as well as the colour commentator for the Calgary Flames games on Sportsnet West. During the 1994 NHL Lockout, he briefly worked for United Parcel Service of Canada in Vancouver, British Columbia.

Since the 2002–03 season, Garrett has served as the colour commentator for Canucks games on Sportsnet Pacific, first being partnered with Jim Hughson and later John Shorthouse. He also had occasional network assignments on HNIC and, since Rogers acquired the Canadian national contract for the NHL in 2014, he sometimes gets network assignments on either Sportsnet or City.

Nicknames
After the 1984-85 season, Garrett earned the nickname "Lotto" because his high goals-against average of 6.49 was the same as Canada's national lottery, Lotto 6/49.

Garrett picked up his Cheech nickname from teammate Rick Smith in the mid-seventies. His afro haircut and moustache resembled Cheech from comedy duo Cheech and Chong.

Career statistics

Regular season and playoffs

References

External links

Profile at hockeydraftcentral.com

1951 births
Birmingham Bulls players
Calgary Flames announcers
Canadian colour commentators
Canadian ice hockey goaltenders
Canadian television sportscasters
Edmonton Oilers announcers
Fredericton Express players
Hartford Whalers players
Ice hockey people from Ontario
Kansas City Blues players
Living people
Minnesota Fighting Saints players
National Hockey League All-Stars
National Hockey League broadcasters
New England Whalers players
People from Quinte West
Peterborough Petes (ice hockey) players
Portland Buckaroos players
Quebec Nordiques players
Richmond Robins players
St. Louis Blues draft picks
Toronto Toros players
Vancouver Canucks announcers
Vancouver Canucks players